Xylopodia is a genus of flowering plants belonging to the family Loasaceae.

Its native range is Peru.

Species:
 Xylopodia klaprothioides Weigend

References

Loasaceae
Cornales genera